Shengjing Times, also known as Shengjing Shibao,  usually abbreviated SJSB,  was a Japanese-owned Chinese newspaper established in Fengtian on October 18, 1906 by Japanese journalist named Nakajima Masao (中島真雄). It received financial assistance from Japan's consulate-general in Fengtian during its early years.

Shengjing Times was the highest circulation Chinese language daily newspaper and the most important instrument of Japanese press influence in Manchuria. It is the first Chinese-language newspaper published by the Japanese in Northeast China, and it was also Japan's longest-published newspaper in China.

With a circulation comparable to that of Far Eastern Journal (远东报), the Shengjing Shibao'''s dominance of public opinion in the Northeast China remained unchallenged after the demise of Far Eastern Journal'' until the closing months of the World War II.

References

Qing dynasty
Defunct newspapers published in China
Publications established in 1906
Publications disestablished in 1945